Shooting Stars is a television drama series spun off from the Singapore Idol singing competition in 2005, starring some of the top idols that year. The cast includes Taufik Batisah, Sylvester Sim, Olinda Cho, Daphne Khoo, Jeassea K. Thyidor, Alfarahizah Awangnit, David Wu, Brendon Lim, and Maylene Loo. The show premiered on August 9, 2005 and ended on October 11, 2005.

Character bio
Taufik Batisah plays a pizza delivery boy who struggles to balance the realities of his life with his dreams of singing. With an overly pragmatic girlfriend who expects an idealistic future together without understanding his love for music, he envies and views well-heeled best friend Aaron as having a great life without realising how controlled Aaron’s life is. Talented and with a keen sense of music, Taufik will discover his own capacity for freedom from the music classes.

Sylvester Sim is a coffee shop owner's son and assistant who is brooding and quiet. Sylvester pines for long-time love interest Dawn but lacks the courage to express his feelings. While concerned about his widowed father, Sylvester is adamant about pursuing his dreams of music, despite his dad’s indignant efforts to get him to take over his drinks stall. His willingness to brave any storm for party-animal Dawn ends in disastrous effects.

Olinda Cho is a tomboy who stumbles along each day as it passes, with no real aim in life. With nothing to worry about and a well-provided life, Olinda hides an insecure self beneath a nonchalant attitude. Olinda especially flounders when human relationship matters crop up.

Daphne Khoo is a mechanical engineering student who is forced by her karaoke champion mum to join the singing class. Living up to expectations is not easy, especially such high ones which Daphne’s karaoke champion mother sets for her. Forced to join a singing class, Daphne drags a good friend along, who, leaning on his good looks to steal her thunder, threatens their future class attendance as they face up to the possibilities of being kicked out.

Jeassea K. Thyidor is an Indonesian housewife who fills the gaps in her leisurely life with her singing course while her rich Indonesian husband is away. All is fun in her class as she learns from her idol George until she finds out a twisted secret about her husband.

Alfarahizah Awangnit plays Su, who is Taufik's girlfriend. Materialistic and yearning for the better life, Su ignores Taufik’s dreams of singing, only urging him to upgrade himself. Her ultimate goal is to attain  the ultimate high life of a big house, big car, and the works.

David Wu plays the gang's music teacher, George. Eccentric and at a crossroads, he is searching for a protégé to groom so that he may take a backseat. Also the central figure upon which the other young characters’ lives revolves around, George anchors his students in their various attempts to pursue their dreams.

Brendon Lim plays Aaron, the well-heeled best friend of Taufik, who shares Taufik’s love for boxing. While Taufik perceives suave Aaron as being the rich and lucky half of the two, Aaron in truth leads a controlled life that leaves little freedom for his own dreams.

Maylene Loo plays Sylvester's girlfriend Dawn. Dawn runs from her problems by indulging in dangerous drugs-and-alcohol cocktails. Unknowingly attracting Sylvester into her dark life to protect herself from her own party-animal lifestyle, she allows Sylvester in her heart and gets intimate with him.

Brandon Wong, a Channel 8 actor, plays the gang leader who harasses Dawn and later rapes her; he will eventually be injured by Sylvester.

Jimmy Tanaeka aka Jimmy T, plays Tjeng, the rich husband of Jeassea who is often away on overseas business trips.

Nathaniel Ho plays Ethan, the best friend of Daphne Khoo who encourages her to overcome her fear prior to the singing competition.

David Aw plays Jack, a longtime friend of Olinda whom she has a crush on.

Story
When renowned songwriter-cum-performer George comes to a crossroad in his life, he looks to nurturing a successor amongst the young talents he teaches. Sly, Taufik, Jeassea, Olinda, and Daphne meet by chance to study under George's tutelage, and they each come with his or her own set of aspirations, struggles, and obstacles.

Striving beyond their adversities and learning to accept differences along the way, these youths learn the rudiments of singing. As this art becomes a common language through George's eccentric but patient guidance, the five troubled youths find their own directions and celebrate their common passion for music.

Episode guide

Episode 1
At a crossroad in his life, George, a renowned songwriter/performer, begins nurturing hopes of grooming a successor.

He gathers a group of young dreamers, and together, each with a different agenda, they set out to find out more about themselves and those who care for them.

Through his eccentric yet patient guidance, George helps his students blossom from rebellious adolescents into sensitive young adults, as singing becomes their shared passion.

Episode 2
Taufik has a keen interest in singing as well as the talent. However, daily living takes a toll on him, and his girlfriend - an all-too-practical woman - does not make things easier. He takes on another job and works out an installment plan to pay his fees.

Kartina takes matters into her own hands and goes to George with the same idea - she will pay Taufik's fees in installments. She plans to sell curry puffs to raise the money. Touched, George decides to take Taufik in.

Taufik's girlfriend Su and his best friend Aaron don't get along. Su wants Taufik to be realistic about his goals; she thinks a frivolous singing class is a waste of money.

However, Aaron believes Taufik should chase his dream. The latter has always perceived his best friend to be rich and lucky, but the truth is Aaron leads a controlled life that leaves little room for his own pursuits.

Episode 3
Taufik has to work out his relationship kinks with Su, his unsupportive girlfriend, balance two jobs, and help his best friend train for a boxing match.

Su becomes increasingly unhappy with Taufik, who has little time for her. She turns to Iskandar.

Iskandar wants to take care of Su, but the latter is still in love with Taufik. Yet, she gradually comes to realise Iskandar is the kind of guy she has always wanted Taufik to be - stable and realistic.

Episode 4
Sylvester gets into trouble with a gang. Bruised, he is late for class. Taufik shows his concern but Sylvester reveals nothing. George looks on in disapproval and chides them.

Back at home, Sylvester's father asks about his bruise. After receiving a phone call, Sylvester rushes to a club to look for Dawn, his love interest.

Dawn has caught her boyfriend kissing another girl passionately. She gets drunk and cries on Sylvester's shoulder.

Sylvester decides to bring her home. As he takes care of her, he tries to express his feelings. They end up kissing, spending the night together.

Sylvester wakes up late the next day. Dawn is already gone. He can hardly concentrate at work as he tries in vain to contact her.

Sylvester looks for Dawn at her workplace, only to find out she is dating another guy. Dawn is shocked to see Sylvester, but he disappears before she can make any explanation.

At a coffee shop that night, Dawn clarifies that the night they spent together was a mistake. She just wants to remain friends.

Dawn leaves, only to be cornered by the same gang who beat up Sylvester. Threatened by her creditors to pay up, she calls Sylvester for help. He resorts to taking cash from his father's coffee shop.

Episode 5
Mr. Sim is furious when he realizes Sylvester has taken all the money from the coffee shop's cash box. He messes up Sylvester's room.

During singing class, Taufik asks Sylvester about writing him a song and is invited to his house to work on it. Both of them are shocked to see the state of Sylvester's room. All his things, including his beloved guitar, have been smashed to pieces.

Mr. Sim softens when he sees fresh bruises on Sylvester again. He ponders the CD he found in Sylvester's room.

Dawn finally tells Sylvester the truth about what has happened. Both feel their friendship has progressed but she is worried about landing him in trouble again.

After they part, Dawn is captured by her creditors again. Unable to pay up, she is raped. After finding out about her rape, Sylvester confronts the gang leader and injures him severely by smashing a beer bottle over his head.

Sylvester tries in vain to contact Dawn. Unable to face him, she writes him a letter and checks into a rehab centre, leaving him no clues to her whereabouts.

While trying to get a CD player to listen to Sylvester's CD, Mr. Sim is knocked down by a car. Sylvester rushes to the hospital. Shocked to find the wrecked CD player and his CD by his father's bed, he struggles to come to terms with his father's love for him.

As Sylvester helps his father run the coffee shop and takes care of him, they come to a mutual understanding and develop a new-found bond.

Episode 6
Daphne has a fear of singing in front of crowds. Her mother, Mavis, on the other hand, is an ex-karaoke champion who grabs every chance to showcase her daughter's talent.

Mavis is unable to resist the opportunity to compete when she hears that her rival, Eileen, has signed her daughter, Evangelina (played by Michelle Ng), up for the annual Karaoke competition.

Mavis declares to her family that she has signed Daphne up as well. Agitated, Daphne quarrels with her.

At school, Daphne confides in her best friend, Ethan. He advises her to stop letting her fear conquer her mind.

When Daphne's mother resorts to emotional blackmail, Daphne gives in. Unable to turn back to Ethan, she seeks George's help. He encourages her to think of someone special when she gets stage fright.

On the day of the competition, Daphne almost backs out when faced with the garish ball gown Mavis wants her to wear. After much encouragement and support from her father, however, she plucks up the courage to carry on.

Daphne is surprised to see Ethan at the competition. The two patch up.

A blackout occurs just as Daphne is about to sing and she panics. Thankfully, Ethan is there to pass her a guitar and reassure her. Recalling George's advice, she sings beautifully.

Episode 7
Olinda is a young adult struggling with her identity and the problems with stereotyping. Her life changes when her childhood Prince Charming, Jack, returns from Australia to visit her.

Olinda recalls how she is always pressured to look as good as her sister, Celia.

At dinner, Robert, the father, instructs both daughters to help out at his cake shop for that week. Both of them are reluctant but are given no choice.

To the girls' surprise, the baker, Nakata, is an attractive Japanese man. Olinda starts fantasizing about Nakata in various romantic scenarios.

Jack asks Celia out on a date and confesses his love for Olinda. Celia agrees to play cupid.

Celia tells Olinda that Jack is leaving the country. Meanwhile, Jack arrives with flowers and a new image. He overhears Olinda saying she will never fall for a wimp like him.

Episode 8
Olinda realizes Jack has overheard her. She wallows in self-pity, until her mother encourages her to make the first move and apologize.

Feeling helpless after nightmares of Jack leaving, Olinda seeks help from George.

Finally, she expresses her feelings for Jack through singing. The two reconcile and make an appointment for a date.

The couple tries to have dinner at a posh restaurant. However, they can't bear the stiff atmosphere and decide to take it easy and revert to their everyday, casual style. At the end of a lovely evening, they kiss goodnight like shy teenagers.

Olinda comes back to class a new and recharged person. Everyone is glad - most of all, herself.

Episode 9
Cast aside by her businessman husband Tjeng in favour of his work, Jeassea yearns for a more meaningful life. With Tjeng travelling frequently to Indonesia, the desperate housewife fills her days with frivolous shopping escapades and high-tea sessions.

Salvation comes in the form of music when she signs up for one of George's singing classes.

When Jeassea is invited to sing at a jazz club, George gives her extra lessons. Over time, their friendship deepens.

On her home front, things worsen when Tjeng's business crumbles. Their marriage deteriorates further with Jeassea's suspicion that Tjeng is having an affair with his business partner.

In the midst of her problems, she develops a crush on George. Fortunately, both are able to control their emotions. With his support, she gets a chance to perform at a posh jazz club, singing to a live audience.

Episode 10 (Finale)
George decides to bring the singing course to a close. Instead of holding a usual lesson, he takes his students to a long, suspended bridge and tells them to cross it blindfolded. His last lesson has to do with overcoming fear.

Taufik imagines his mother's encouraging voice to shake off his fear of losing his own voice. Sly drowns out the doubt in his head by singing the song he has composed for Dawn. Daphne panics but imagines Ethan at the end of the bridge and moves on eagerly. Jeassea lets go of her self-consciousness and struts across the bridge.

Olinda gives George a cheeky grin and runs across.

Watching them cheering each other from afar, a proud George decides it is time he left them to grow on their own.

Two years pass. The five budding talents have remained good friends.

Jeassea is actively raising funds for orphans at a children's home. Taufik is a recognized singer. Sylvester has become a well-known composer. Daphne is a DJ at her polytechnic school. Ethan finally asks her to be his girlfriend.

Olinda is successfully managing her father's cake shop and is happily attached to Jack.

The five friends meet up. Jeassea asks Taufik to help sing at a fundraising concert. He agrees and the rest decide to chip in too.

On the day of the concert, the group of five performs beautifully, unaware George has returned to watch them from afar.

Cast
 Taufik Batisah as himself
 Sylvester Sim as himself
 Olinda Cho as herself
 Daphne Khoo as herself
 Jeassea K. Thyidor as herself
 Alfarahizah Awangnit as Su
 David Wu as George
 Brendon Lim as Aaron
 Maylene Loo as Dawn
 Brandon Wong as gang leader
 Jimmy Taenaka as Tjeng
 Nathaniel Ho as Ethan
 David Aw as Jack
 Michelle Ng as Evangelina

2005 Singaporean television series debuts
2005 Singaporean television series endings
Singapore Chinese dramas
Channel 5 (Singapore) original programming